William Andrew Ogles IV (born June 18, 1971) is an American politician and businessman who has served as the U.S. representative for Tennessee's 5th congressional district since 2023. A member of the Republican Party, he served as the mayor of Maury County, Tennessee, from 2018 to 2022. 

Ogles has worked as a conservative activist, serving as the executive director of the Laffer Center, a think tank supportive of fiscal conservatism and the free market, and the Tennessee chapter of Americans for Prosperity, a similarly-minded organization funded by the Koch brothers.

Ogles has taken strongly conservative positions and been described by media as on the far-right of the political spectrum. He opposes abortion and same-sex marriage. Ogles has said that the 2020 presidential election was stolen, and was one of the original 19 congressmen to vote against Kevin McCarthy for Speaker of the House. Ogles later voted for McCarthy after he was satisfied with concessions McCarthy made.

Early life and education
Ogles was born on June 18, 1971. He describes himself as "a Maury County native with deep family roots in Tennessee dating back to the founding of the state." Ogles attended Western Kentucky University from 1990 to 1993, studying allied language arts and English. 

Ogles later studied at Middle Tennessee State University (MTSU), where he failed every course taken in the fall of 1995 and the fall of 1998; he returned to the university in 2007 and graduated with a 2.4 grade point average, with a bachelor of science in Liberal Studies. The Washington Post described Liberal Studies as "a general education degree typically for those who cannot settle on a major"; NewsChannel 5 gave a similar description. Ogles said in late February 2023 that his failed university courses were due to "an interfamilial matter" that led him to abandon his studies "to financially support my family during a difficult time"; and that he eventually completed his studies with online courses.

Disputed education details 
After Ogles became a congressman in 2023, his congressional biography claimed that he received his degree from MTSU, "where he studied policy and economics." Ogles' claim was questioned by NewsChannel 5 on February 16, 2023, which published an investigatory report detailing that in a 2009 resume and also in a background check of unspecified date, Ogles claimed to have an MTSU degree in international relations, with minors in psychology and English. NewsChannel 5 additionally reported that MTSU declined to confirm Ogles' degree, referencing a federal law allowing students (like Ogles) the ability to block the release of academic records. Ogles later spoke to WWTN radio, calling for everyone to "lock down your transcripts ... so you're not a victim of identity theft." In other comments to WTTN made on February 21, 2023, Ogles said that he does not remember "saying I had an economics degree … because I've been quite clear that I studied political science and international relations", while maintaining that he studied political science from "the economic perspective".

On February 26, Ogles said that he was "mistaken" in claiming to have an MTSU degree in international relations, and claimed that he requested his college transcript the week before, and only learned then that his degree was actually in Liberal Studies. NewsChannel 5 called Ogles's statement "apparently preemptive" because Ogles "ignored our requests for comment" after the media outlet obtained his MTSU transcript from an old job application. On February 27, NewsChannel 5 published Ogles's transcript, which showed that Ogles took only one economics course at a community college, scoring a C pass, while he passed nine (and failed several other) political science courses at MTSU. By February 28, Ogles's congressional biography was edited to simply state: "Andy obtained his degree from MTSU."

Business and early political career
Ogles has worked as a restaurant operator and a real estate investor. His involvement in politics began when he became the first director of the Tennessee chapter of Americans for Prosperity, a conservative political advocacy group. He later became involved with the Laffer Center, an organization that advocates for fiscally conservative tax policy. He has also been a Club for Growth Foundation fellow.

Ogles made two unsuccessful bids for elected office, a run for the state's 4th district in 2002 and for Tennessee Senate in 2006, losing in the Republican primary both times.

In September 2017, Ogles announced he would challenge incumbent U.S. Senator Bob Corker, whom he believed was insufficiently conservative, in the following year's primary. Two months later, Corker announced that he would retire instead of seeking the 2018 nomination. That led incumbent U.S. Representative Marsha Blackburn, the eventual winner, and former representative Stephen Fincher to announce they would seek the seat, and as their campaigns were likely to be well-funded, Ogles announced shortly afterward that he would withdraw.

Disputed career claims 

Ogles has repeatedly made public claims of being an "economist." After NewsChannel 5 questioned how much formal training in economics Ogles had, he said he was an economist because when "you look at the body of someone's work ... I've spent the last decade working on economic policy and tax policy. " During that time, Ogles had worked for roughly five years as an anti-tax lobbyist with Americans for Prosperity, and then for a year as the executive director of the Laffer Center, an organisation run by economist Arthur Laffer. The executive director position seemed to involve mainly "administrative" work, reported NewsChannel 5, with Ogles not being named as an author of any economic reports uploaded on the Laffer Center's website. Ogles' congressional website claims that "while working at the Laffer Center, Andy became a nationally recognized expert on tax policy and healthcare, having been featured in numerous publications, including The Wall Street Journal and Investor’s Business Daily". NewsChannel 5 questioned this claim, being unable to find any articles in the publications independently citing him as an expert, only finding three columns written by Ogles in these publications, all of which were written when he was a lobbyist, before he worked for the Laffer Center.

At a political debate, Ogles called himself "a former member of law enforcement, worked in international sex crimes, specifically child trafficking", while at a separate forum, he said: "I went into law enforcement. I worked in human trafficking." NewsChannel 5 reported that Ogles was a volunteer reserve deputy with the Williamson County Sheriff's Office from 2009 to 2011, with his position revoked for failing to meet minimum standards, failing to progress in field training, and failing to attend required meetings. The Williamson County Sheriff's Office said that records do not show Ogles trained or worked against international sex trafficking as a reserve deputy. In 2011, Ogles worked as a chief operating officer for Abolition International, a non-profit organisation which described its work as giving grants to "holistic ministries". Ogles indicated that since his stint at Abolition International overlapped his stint as a reserve deputy, "Maybe I created some of the confusion or maybe it was someone looking to write a story". While Ogles claimed he was "heavily involved in the fight against human trafficking", NewsChannel 5 reported that Abolition International's tax records showed that Ogles worked in a part-time position that paid him $4,000 in total. Ogles' congressional website originally claimed that Ogles was "overseeing operations and investments in 12 countries" for Abolition International; but NewsChannel 5 disputed that number as too large; the website later amended its claim to overseeing operations and investments in “several countries.”

Child burial garden controversy
In 2014, Ogles and his wife had a stillborn child, Lincoln, whose photograph Ogles has used in social media posts. Ogles set up a GoFundMe to finance a child burial garden in memory of his stillborn son, which was to contain a "life-size statue of Jesus watching over the children, benches for families to sit while surrounded by flowers in the special garden" that was to be "a place for Lincoln's new play friends as they wait in Heaven to their families". The fundraiser brought in $23,565 but as of March 2023 there is no public evidence that the garden was ever built and Ogles has refused to answer questions about what happened to the money. At least one donor demanded their money back and received a refund. In 2022, Ogles spoke publicly about difficulties he experienced in 2014 in getting health insurers to pay his wife's medical bills after their child was stillborn, and blamed Obamacare for the insurance problems.

County mayoralty
Initially considered a potential contender in the 2018 Tennessee gubernatorial election, Ogles instead saw his major first electoral success when he was elected mayor of Maury County in the August 2, 2018, general election, defeating incumbent Charlie Norman. 

During his mayoralty, Ogles criticized Tennessee Governor Bill Lee for not restricting local school boards' ability to implement mask mandates in response to the COVID-19 pandemic, calling for the state legislature to pass legislation to support his proposition in a special session. He supported a sales tax increase that passed in 2020.

Ogles initially filed to run for a second term as county mayor but withdrew to enter the race for the redrawn U.S. House of Representatives seat in Tennessee's 5th congressional district. After he had announced his candidacy for Congress, a month before the Republican primary, he vetoed that year's county budget, along with the school and library budgets, over a 31-cent property tax hike (the first in six years) and what he considered the library's exposure of young children to inappropriate "woke" material. The county commission complained it had not been aware of any concerns Ogles had had over the budget, noting that he rarely attended meetings and had taken no part in the budget process. Ogles said that since he could not vote at the meetings it was not necessary for him to attend them and that he kept up by watching them online. Two weeks later the county commission overrode the veto, citing Maury's status as the fastest-growing county in the state. Some commissioners and citizens commenting at that meeting accused Ogles of having vetoed the budget largely to bolster his credentials as a fiscal conservative in the upcoming primary; it was noted that his absence from that particular meeting might have been because it conflicted with a campaign event.

U.S. House of Representatives

Election

Primary
Ogles seemed to some observers to have gotten off to a strong start in the primary, announcing that he had raised nearly half a million dollars in the campaign's first month. But when his disclosure report was actually filed, a week after the deadline, it showed that he had raised only $264,400, although he did have over $500,000 in total receipts. He explained that he had not counted a $320,000 personal loan to the campaign.

Among the many candidates, two stood out as serious challengers: former state House Speaker Beth Harwell, and retired U.S. Army Brigadier General Kurt Winstead. Ads by the Tennessee Conservatives Political Action Committee (TCPAC) called Ogles a "D.C. insider" and lobbyist who had failed to pay his property taxes nine times while supporting the sales tax hike and a marriage tax, as well as failing to vigorously oppose Maury County's recent property tax hike. Records showed that Ogles had indeed been from a few days to almost a year late paying taxes on his Franklin home between 2005 and 2015, leading to interest charges. He filed a defamation suit against TCPAC. Ogles, in turn, was supported by super PACs that ran ads attacking Harwell and Winstead as "too liberal for Tennessee."

On August 4, Ogles won the primary.

General

Ogles faced Democratic nominee Heidi Campbell in the November general election. The district was previously a Democratic stronghold centered on Nashville, but has been redrawn as an area that voted for Republican Donald Trump by 12 percentage points in the 2020 presidential election. This was done by splitting Democratic-heavy Nashville into three congressional districts. When the new district boundaries were announced, the Democratic incumbent decided to retire, calling the new district "unwinnable" for a Democrat.

On August 30, Ogles was succeeded as county mayor by Sheila Butt, a former member of the Tennessee House of Representatives. Ogles was endorsed by the House Freedom Caucus, the House Republican Conference's farthest-right bloc.

During the election, Ogles avoided the major local media in favor of conservative local talk radio and posted very little on social media. Early in the campaign, he made some appearances with a flamethrower, saying he would use it on President Joe Biden's work when he got to Washington. A late October appearance with Texas U.S. Senator Ted Cruz in Franklin was announced in his first campaign-related Twitter post since he won the Republican primary. He declined all invitations to debate, drawing criticism from McCarthy. 

Ogles was slightly outraised and outspent. He raised almost $1 million for his campaign, including the loan, and spent $573,000. In contrast, Campbell raised over $1 million, none of it in loans, and spent $679,000, largely on television ads.

The election was complicated by local officials inadvertently sending 1,000 voters ballots with the wrong congressional or state legislative district elections on them, due to a mistake made with Davidson County's geographic information system database. A lawsuit the Tennessee League of Women Voters chapter brought against the state that could have delayed voting in the county was settled at the last minute. As a result, 438 voters who had already cast the wrong ballot were allowed to vote on provisional ballots that were only to be counted if the final margin was narrower. 

It was not. Ogles won the general election in November with 56% of the vote to Campbell's 41%, becoming the first Republican to represent the state's 5th district since the 19th century and leaving Nashville without any Democratic representatives in Congress for the first time in modern history.

Tenure
On January 1, 2023, Ogles signed a letter by fellow representatives Scott Perry and Chip Roy expressing opposition to fellow Republican Kevin McCarthy in the upcoming house speakership election after McCarthy did not accept all their proposed House rules changes. On January 3, his first day in office, Ogles joined far-right House Republicans in voting against McCarthy on the first three ballots. This was the first time since 1923 that a speaker was not elected on the first ballot. On January 6, after days of negotiations, Ogles voted for McCarthy on the 12th ballot, joining the rest of Tennessee's Republican delegation. He explained in a statement that this was because he believed negotiations between McCarthy and the other holdouts were going well.

Shortly after being sworn in, Ogles was appointed to the House Financial Services Committee.

The first bill Ogles introduced, the Inflation Reduction Act of 2023, would repeal the previous year's Inflation Reduction Act. In his State of the Union speech, Biden mentioned the bill without mentioning Ogles's name, which Ogles took credit for in a subsequent tweet.

Syria
In 2023, Ogles was among 47 Republicans to vote in favor of H.Con.Res. 21, which directed President Joe Biden to remove U.S. troops from Syria within 180 days.

Political positions 
Media sources have characterized Ogles's political views as conservative or far-right.

Ogles opposes abortion and same-sex marriage. In a 2022 interview, he downplayed the need for exceptions in an abortion bill, calling them "red herrings". In June 2022, after the repeal of Roe v. Wade, Ogles said, "The next thing we have to do is go after gay marriage."

Ogles has called for the impeachment of President Joe Biden and Vice President Kamala Harris, and for treason charges to be brought against Secretary of Homeland Security Alejandro Mayorkas. He has called for the United States Department of Education to be defunded.

Ogles denies the legitimacy of the 2020 United States presidential election.

Ogles supports school choice, term limits, deregulating health care, and lower taxes. He opposes earmarks.

Personal life
Ogles lives on a farm in Culleoka, Tennessee with his wife, Monica, and their three children.

Electoral history

References

External links
 Congressman Andy Ogles official U.S. House website
 Andy Ogles for Congress campaign website
 
 

|-

1971 births
21st-century American politicians
American Protestants
Candidates in the 2002 United States elections
Candidates in the 2006 United States elections
Christians from Tennessee
Far-right politicians in the United States
Heads of county government in Tennessee
Living people
Middle Tennessee State University alumni
People from Culleoka, Tennessee
Protestants from Tennessee
Republican Party members of the United States House of Representatives from Tennessee
Tennessee Republicans